Benevides may refer to:

Places
 Benevides, Brazil
 Benevides Formation

People
 Cecilia Benevides Meireles (1901–1964), Brazilian writer and educator 
 Diego de Benavides, 8th Count of Santisteban (1607–1666), Spanish military officer, administrator, and writer
 Felipe Benevides (born 1989), Brazilian football player
 Mike Benevides (born 1968), Canadian football coach
 Robert Benevides (1930–1993), partner of U.S. actor Raymond Burr and wine entrepreneur 
 Salvador Correia de Sá e Benevides (circa 1602–1688), Portuguese admiral and administrator
 Santos Benevides (1823–1891), officer in the Confederate army during the U.S. Civil War
 Thiago Benevides Gonçalves (born 1987), Brazilian football player
 Benevides Juan Ramirez (died 1782), Spanish painter

Other
 Mictopsichia benevides, a species of moth

See also
 Benavides (disambiguation)
 Benavidez